Yaohong Road is a metro station on the Line 15 of the Shanghai Metro. Located at the intersection of Guyang Road and Yaohong Road in Changning District, Shanghai, the station is scheduled to open with the rest of Line 15 by the end of 2020. However, the station eventually opened on 23 January 2021 following a one-month postponement. The station is one of the few stations of the line located on an east–west orientation.

References 

Railway stations in Shanghai
Shanghai Metro stations in Changning District
Line 15, Shanghai Metro
Railway stations in China opened in 2021